Stadelman is a surname. Notable people with the surname include:

Peter J. Stadelman (1871–1954), American businessman and politician
Steve Stadelman (born 1960), American politician

See also
Stadelmann